The Ferny Grove railway line is a  suburban railway line in Brisbane, the state capital of Queensland, Australia. It is part of the Queensland Rail City network.

History

Based on initial surveys, in 1885 the Queensland Government planned to construct a railway line to Samford with the intention of extending it to Gympie. However, no immediate action was taken and further surveys resulted in the decision to construct the line to Gympie via the Mayne railway station (Bowen Hills) which created the North Coast railway line.

The relocation of Brisbane's cattle sales yard from Normanby to Newmarket created a need to provide a railway to Newmarket. With financial guarantees provided by the Windsor Shire Council and the Enoggera Divisional Board, the Queensland Railways built a branch line from Mayne railway station (Bowen Hills) to Newmarket railway station to service the cattle yards and beyond to Enoggera railway station for suburban passenger services. This line opened on 5 February 1899. The suburban service to Enoggera was not very profitable and the Queensland Government resisted any efforts to extend the Brisbane tramway services to Enoggera to avoid further competition.

With the financial assistance of the Australian Defence Department, the line was extended to Rifle Range railway station (now called Gaythorne railway station) on 16 February 1916. The line was extended to Mitchelton railway station on 2 March 1918. The line was extended to Samford railway station on 1 July 1918, to Samsonvale railway station (3 March 1919), to Kobble railway station (3 November 1919) and finally to Dayboro railway station on 25 September 1920. The additional traffic on the line led to its duplication to Newmarket in 1921. The sales yards were moved to Cannon Hill in 1931.

On 5 May 1947, a packed excursion train derailed at Camp Mountain, after Ferny Grove railway station, in what is Queensland's worst rail tragedy, the Camp Mountain train disaster.

The line was duplicated to Mitchelton in 1953, and the first automatic level crossing boom gates in Queensland were installed at Wilston Road, Newmarket in 1954.

The line was closed beyond Ferny Grove in 1955 after the freight traffic was lost to road transport. Ferny Grove was initially known as Ferny Flats, but the railway department changed the name of the railway station because of a Ferny Flats in New South Wales; the surrounding area followed suit.

2008–2012 upgrades
Between 2008 and 2012 the remaining single track section between Mitchelton and Ferny Grove was duplicated, including an upgraded Ferny Grove station, an additional 1000 car parking spaces and construction of a new bus interchange.

Line guide, frequency and services

Typical service frequency on the Ferny Grove Line is four trains per hour (every 15 minutes) on weekdays and two trains per hour (every 30 minutes) at night and on weekends, increasing to 8 trains per hour (every 7.5 minutes) during weekday peak times for faster travel times for commuters working in the Brisbane central business district. Most services stop at all stations to Roma Street railway station.  The typical travel time between Ferny Grove and Brisbane City is approximately 31 minutes (to Central).

Ferny Grove line services typically continue as Beenleigh line services.

Passengers for and from the Airport, Caboolture, Doomben, Nambour and Gympie North and Shorncliffe lines change at Bowen Hills, and all other lines at Roma Street.

References

External links
TransLink

Brisbane railway lines
Public transport in Brisbane
3 ft 6 in gauge railways in Australia